Utah State Route 263 may refer to:
Utah State Route 263 (1959-1969)
Utah State Route 263 (1969-1985)